Long Live Death (English: either "Long Live Death" or "Live the Death", German: Es lebe der Tod) may refer to:

 Tatort: Es lebe der Tod 2016 German television film and TV episode of the series Tatort
 Viva la muerte (film), by Fernando Arrabal
 Viva la Muerte (Cobra Verde album), 1994
 Viva la Muerte (Inkubus Sukkubus album), 2008

See also
 Long Live Your Death, a 1971 Italian/Spanish/German film